Soaring Concepts, Inc., called Soaring Concepts Aerospace since 2015, is an American aircraft manufacturer founded by Galen Geigley and based in Sturgis, Michigan. The company specializes in the design and manufacture of powered parachutes in the form of kits for amateur construction and ready-to-fly aircraft under the US light-sport aircraft rules.

The company was founded in 2000 to produce a single product, the Soaring Concepts Sky Trek, a powered parachute design that is optimized for use as a trainer. It has a higher than normal propeller ground clearance and larger diameter 4130 steel tubing for added strength, as well as other features that make it suitable for training use. The aircraft has been accepted as a light-sport aircraft by the Federal Aviation Administration (FAA). By August 2015 the company had produced at least 25 aircraft that had been registered in the US by the FAA.

Aircraft

References

External links

Aircraft manufacturers of the United States
Ultralight aircraft
Homebuilt aircraft
Powered parachutes
St. Joseph County, Michigan
2000 establishments in Michigan
American companies established in 2000
Manufacturing companies established in 2000